Ethmia janzeni is a moth in the family Depressariidae. It is found from Mexico to San Salvador, as well as in north-western Costa Rica. The habitat consists of dry forests and rain forests.

It is similar to the closely related species Ethmia elutella, but differs by having a generally paler color and an ocherous rather than gray hindwing costal hair-pencil. The ground color of the hindwings is white near the base, becoming pale grayish toward the margins.

References

Moths described in 1973
janzeni